Upper Kutinga is a gram panchayat village in Laxmipur block, Koraput district, Odisha.

Villages in Koraput district